Son of Cliché is a comedy sketch show that ran for two series on BBC Radio 4 between 23 August 1983 and 29 December 1984.

The sketches were written by Rob Grant and Doug Naylor, and were performed by Chris Barrie, Nick Maloney, Nick Wilton, and in the penultimate episode of the second series, guest performer Paul B. Davies, with music by Peter Brewis. The series was a follow-up to Grant and Naylor's 1981 series Cliché, which Maloney had also featured in.

One of the recurring sketches from the second series of the show, "Dave Hollins: Space Cadet", formed the basis for the BBC2 TV sci-fi comedy Red Dwarf, which Grant and Naylor also scripted and in which Barrie starred.

References

BBC Radio comedy programmes
BBC Radio 4 programmes